Platypleura mijburghi is a medium-sized cicada species, that is native to South Africa. It has been recorded in Gauteng, Mpumalanga and the Northern Province. The adults are active from October to January.

References

External links

Platypleura
Insects described in 1866
Insects of Africa